Lepidochrysops barnesi, the Barnes' blue, is a butterfly in the family Lycaenidae. It is found in the Chimanimani Mountains of Zimbabwe. The habitat consists of montane grassland at altitudes of about 1,800 metres.

Adults are on wing from mid-October to November.

References

Butterflies described in 1953
Lepidochrysops
Endemic fauna of Zimbabwe
Butterflies of Africa